Regimbartina pruinosa is a species of beetle in the family Dytiscidae, the only species in the genus Regimbartina. The known distribution of the species is in Cameroon, Angola, and Gabon.

References

Dytiscidae